According to the Buddhavaṃsa and Buddhist mythology, Sikhī (Pāli) is the twenty-third of twenty-eight Buddhas. The penultimate Buddha of the Alamkarakalpa (Adorned Eon), Sikhī was preceded by Vipassī Buddha and succeeded by Vessabhū Buddha.

Etymology
He was called Sikhī because his unhisa (turban) looked like a sikha (flame).

Biography
According to the Buddhavamsa as well as traditional Buddhist legend, Sikhī lived 31 kalpas — many billions of years — before the present time. He was born in Aruṇavatī, which is located in the Dhule district of Maharashtra, in present-day India. His family was of the Kshatriya varna, which constituted the ruling and military elite of the Vedic period. His father was Aruṇa the warrior-chief, and his mother was Pabhāvatī. His wife was Sabbakama, and he had a son named Atula.

Sikhī lived in the palaces of Sucanda, Giri and Vāhana for 7,000 Days (7,000 years according to the legends) until he renounced his worldly life, riding out of the palace on an elephant. He practiced asceticism for eight months before attaining enlightenment under a pundarika tree. Just prior to achieving buddhahood, he accepted a bowl of milk rice from the daughter of Piyadassī (a sethi from the town of Sudassana Nigama), and sat on a grass seat prepared by Anomadassi, an Ājīvika ascetic.

Sources differ as to how long Sikhī lived. He was reported to have died in Dussarama (or Assarama), somewhere near the Silavati River, at the age of either 37,000 or 70,000 Days.

Physical characteristics

Teachings
Sikhī preached his first sermon in Migachira Park to 100,000 disciples, his second sermon to 80,000 disciples, and his third sermon to 70,000 disciples.

He demonstrated his twin miracle at a place near Suriyavati under a champaka tree. Abhibhu and Sambhava were his chief monk disciples; and Akhila (or Makhila) and Paduma were his principal female disciples. His chief attendant was Khemankara. Sirivaddha and Chanda (or Nanda) were his chief male patrons; and Chitta and Sugutta were the chief among the women.

See also
 Buddhist cosmology
 Glossary of Buddhism
 Longevity myths

Notes

Buddhas